Sabine Devooght (born 24 April 1986) is a Belgian female badminton player.

Achievements

BWF International Challenge/Series
Mixed Doubles

 BWF International Challenge tournament
 BWF International Series tournament
 BWF Future Series tournament

References

External links
 
 

1986 births
Living people
Belgian female badminton players